La Voz Kids is a Spanish-language American singing competition television series that premiered May 5, 2013 on Telemundo. It is part of the reality singing competition [[List of The Voice Kids TV series|The Voice Kids''' worldwide franchise]], created by Dutch television producer John de Mol. The show ran for four seasons between 2013 and 2016.

Overview
In 2013, American Spanish-language network Telemundo (a subsidiary of NBCUniversal Television Group) introduced a children's version of The Voice in Spanish called La Voz Kids. It featured Spanish-speaking American children from 7 to 15 years of age. Prizes include $50,000 cash for their education and a recording contract with Universal Music Group. The show debuted on May 5, 2013, and is hosted by Jorge Bernal (from ¡Suelta La Sopa!) and Daisy Fuentes. The coaches in season one were Prince Royce, Paulina Rubio, and Roberto Tapia. The first season aired 13 episodes with the season finale airing on July 28, 2013.

Season two saw Natalia Jiménez replace Paulina Rubio as one of the coaches. The other coaches and hosts remained the same.

For the show's third season, Daddy Yankee and Pedro Fernandez took Tapia and Royce's place as the new coaches along with season two veteran Natalia Jiménez.

At their 2015 Upfronts, Telemundo announced that La Voz Kids'' would return for a fourth season, with all three Season 3 coaches returning.

Coaches and hosts

The coaches in the first season were Prince Royce, Paulina Rubio and Roberto Tapia. In the second season, Natalia Jiménez replaced Rubio. For the show's third season, Daddy Yankee and Pedro Fernández took Tapia and Royce's place as the new coaches along with season two veteran Natalia Jiménez. Coaches remained all the same for the fourth season.

Series overview

  Team Royce
  Team Paulina
  Team Roberto

  Team Yankee
  Team Natalia
  Team Pedro

References

2010s American music television series
2010s American reality television series
2013 American television series debuts
2016 American television series endings
Television series about children
Television series about teenagers